was a Japanese nobleman of the late Asuka period and early Nara period.

Life 

With the establishment of the yakusa no kabane system in 684, he gained the title of Ason. In 689, he became vice-director of the dazaifu. He developed experience entertaining guests of honor from other countries. He took part in the planning of the Taihō Code alongside Prince Osakabe and Fujiwara no Fuhito, and in 701 was promoted to head of the Ministry of Popular Affairs. Mahito was also appointed as chief diplomat on a mission to Tang China, receiving a ceremonial sword  from Emperor Tenmu as a symbol of his command. This was the first example of such a sword being bestowed, and the action would be repeated for other emissaries to Tang and for important generals.

In mid-702 he was promoted to sangi, and a month later departed for China, accompanied by Yamanoue no Okura and the monk  and bearing the Taihō Code. This was the first full Japanese diplomatic mission to China since the two met in conflict at the Battle of Baekgang. Arriving in Chang'an the next year, the envoys had an audience with Empress Consort Wu. The Chinese evaluated Mahito as a poised and elegant man, well-read and learned in the Chinese classics, and he received a temporary position in the government from the Empress.

In 704, the mission returned to Japan, along with some Japanese who had been captives since the Battle of Baekgang. Mahito was rewarded with land in Yamato Province.

Upon entering the priesthood, he took on the Dharma name Dōkan (道観).

Notes

References 

719 deaths
People of Asuka-period Japan
People of Nara-period Japan
Asuka period Buddhist clergy
Nara period Buddhist clergy
Year of birth unknown
Japanese ambassadors to the Tang dynasty
Taihō Code